Franz Beyer (26 February 1922, in Weingarten – 29 June 2018, in Munich) was a German musicologist who is best known for his revising and restoration of Wolfgang Amadeus Mozart's music, in particular his unfinished Requiem, KV 626, which he restored in the early 1970s.

In 1962 he became professor for viola and chamber music at the Hochschule für Musik und Theater München.

His revision of the Requiem was in keeping with Mozart's actual musical style, not his own interpretation of the work.  He has also revised and/or edited works of other composers.  He has also played in the Collegium Aureum as a violist, and collaborated with the Melos Quartet as additional violist when performing Mozart's string quintets.

Awards
 6 August 2002 Medal of the City of Munich, Munich lights - the friends of Munich in silver.
 2003 Order of Merit, First Class awarded.

References

External links
"Beyer, Franz; 1922-", Deutsche National Bibliotek
"Beyer, Franz; 1922-", Music, Deutsche National Bibliotek
:de:Franz Beyer, German Wikipedia article
Schelklingen

1922 births
2018 deaths
People from Weingarten, Württemberg
People from the Free People's State of Württemberg
German classical violists
German musicologists
Mozart scholars
Officers Crosses of the Order of Merit of the Federal Republic of Germany